Ief Verbrugghe (born 25 July 1975 in Tienen) is a Belgian former professional cyclist. He rode his entire career on the  team, and rode in four editions of the Giro d'Italia. He did not achieve any professional wins.

He is the younger brother of former cyclist Rik Verbrugghe.

Major results
1999
 3rd Cholet-Pays de Loire

References

External links

1975 births
Living people
Belgian male cyclists
People from Tienen
Cyclists from Flemish Brabant